Instituto Superior Autónomo de Estudos Politécnicos (IPA) is a private polytechnic institution, located in Lisbon that offers courses in arts, technology and innovation.

See also
List of colleges and universities in Portugal
Higher education in Portugal

External links
Official website - Instituto Superior Autónomo de Estudos Politécnicos
IPA on Facebook

Polytechnics in Portugal